Bruce Eckel (born July 8, 1957) is a computer programmer, author and consultant. His best known works are Thinking in Java and Thinking in C++, aimed at programmers wanting to learn the Java or C++ programming languages, particularly those with little experience of object-oriented programming. Eckel was a founding member of the ANSI/ISO C++ standard committee.

Views on computing
In 2011, Eckel wrote about the Go programming language, stating:

Bibliography
 Computer Interfacing with Pascal & C, Bruce Eckel. Eisys 1988, .
 Using C++, Bruce Eckel. Osborne/McGraw-Hill 1989, .
 C++ Inside & Out, Bruce Eckel. Osborne/McGraw-Hill 1993, .
 Blackbelt C++: The Masters Collection, Edited by Bruce Eckel. M&T/Holt 1994, .
 Thinking in C++: Introduction to Standard C++, Volume One (2nd Edition), Bruce Eckel. Prentice-Hall PTR 2000,  . Available for free download 
 Thinking in C++, Vol. 2: Practical Programming, 2nd Edition, Bruce Eckel and Chuck Allison. Prentice-Hall PTR, 2003.  . Available for free download 
 Thinking in Java, 4th Edition, Bruce Eckel. Prentice-Hall PTR, 2006. .
 "First Steps in Flex", Bruce Eckel and James Ward. MindView, Inc., 2008. .
 "Atomic Scala", Bruce Eckel and Dianne Marsh. Mindview, LLC, 2013. .
 "On Java 8", Bruce Eckel, MindView LLC, 2017. .
 "Atomic Kotlin", Bruce Eckel & Svetlana Isakova, MindView LLC, 2021. .

Further reading
 Interview with Bruce Eckel by Clay Shannon

References

External links
 Eckel's website
 List of other interviews with him
 Latest news on upcoming book Atomic Kotlin
  - Eckel on building corporate cultures that increase employee happiness and thus employee productivity, O'Reilly Open Source Convention, 2013

People in information technology
American technology writers
1957 births
Living people